Onyebuchi Ojieh, known by his stage name Buchi (born April 4, 1979) is a Nigerian comedian, composer, writer, and actor from Delta State, Nigeria.

Early life and education 
Buchi was born in Kwale Ndokwa West, Delta State, Nigeria. He attended D.S.C Nursery and Primary School and Ovwian Secondary School in Ovwian, Warri. After secondary school, he attended Bendel State University (now known as the Ambrose Alli University), where he studied law.

Comedy career 
Buchi began his comedy career in 2008, after he was introduced to comedian Tee-A, who invited Buchi to his show Tee-A Live N Naked. Show in Lagos. This led to meetings with other comedians, such as Ali Baba and Opa Williams, who gave Buchi a spot on his Nite of A 1000 Laughs show.  Buchi has performed alongside other comedians, such as I Go Dye, I Go Save, Basketmouth, and Bovi, among others.

Awards

See also
 List of Igbo people
 List of Nigerian comedians

References

External links 

1979 births
Living people
Nigerian male comedians
Ambrose Alli University alumni
Entertainers from Delta State
Igbo male actors
Nigerian stand-up comedians
Male actors from Delta State
Nigerian composers
Nigerian male writers
Nigerian television actors